The Central Florida Krush was a W-League franchise based in Winter Park, Florida. The team played at Showalter Field, which they shared with the Premier Development League club, Central Florida Kraze. The team folded after the 2006 season.

Year-by-year

Honors
 USL W-League Central Conference Champions 2005

Notable former players
  Heather Mitts

External links 
Central Florida Krush official site

Women's soccer clubs in the United States
Soccer clubs in Florida
Seminole County, Florida
Defunct USL W-League (1995–2015) teams
Orlando City U-23
Soccer clubs in Orlando, Florida
2006 disestablishments in Florida
2005 establishments in Florida
Association football clubs established in 2005
Association football clubs disestablished in 2006
Women's sports in Florida